The Edward French House is a historic house located in The Dalles, Oregon, United States. Originally dating from circa 1865, it was acquired by the French family in 1892 and renovated by them in the Italianate style in circa 1900. Edward French, along with his uncle Daniel and other members of the French family, were prominent bankers and businessmen from early The Dalles until the 1920s.

The house was listed on the National Register of Historic Places in 1992.

See also
National Register of Historic Places listings in Wasco County, Oregon

References

External links

Houses completed in 1865
National Register of Historic Places in Wasco County, Oregon
Houses on the National Register of Historic Places in Oregon
Houses in The Dalles, Oregon
Italianate architecture in Oregon
1865 establishments in Oregon
Historic district contributing properties in Oregon